Ferdinand Ottoman Bismarck Kulpa (17 November 1886 – 16 November 1960) was an Australian rules footballer who played with St Kilda in the Victorian Football League (VFL).

Notes

External links 

1886 births
1960 deaths
Australian rules footballers from Melbourne
St Kilda Football Club players
People from Carlton, Victoria